The 1950 Maryland State Hawks football team was an American football team that represented Maryland State College (now known as University of Maryland Eastern Shore) during the 1950 college football season. In their third season under head coach Vernon McCain, the team compiled an 8–0 record and outscored opponents by a total of 361 to 32. The 1950 team achieved the second consecutive undefeated season for the program.  The 1949 and 1950 teams went 16–0 and outscored opponents by a combined total of 671 to 40.

The 1950 Maryland State team was ranked No. 3 among the nation's black college football teams according to the Pittsburgh Courier and its Dickinson Rating System. In the final Dickinson rankings, three undefeated black colleges received the following point totals: Florida A&M (28.76); Southern (28.50); and Maryland State (28.00).

Maryland State was led on offense by halfback Sylvester Polk. Polk led the nation in 1949 with 129 points scored. During the 1950 season, Polk scored 13 touchdowns for 78 points and totaled 1,275 rushing yards on 79 carries, an average of 16.1 yards per carry.

Schedule

References

Maryland State
Maryland Eastern Shore Hawks football seasons
College football undefeated seasons
Maryland State Hawks football